Grippe is the first album by the post-hardcore band, Jawbox. It was released in May 1991 on Dischord Records.

This is the only Jawbox album with the band as a trio, since second guitarist Bill Barbot would join the band shortly after the album's release for its touring cycle.

Background
"Consolation Prize" appeared on a cassette-tape that had been floating around the hardcore scene albeit in demo form (this version was called simply "Consolation"). "Bullet Park" had also been previously released in demo form, but on a Maximumrocknroll compilation, in 1989. "Footbinder" appeared on a compilation for the indie label Simple Machines shortly before the album release. The last four tracks on the album had previously been released as a self-titled EP in 1990. The original vinyl and cassette copies of the album does not include the last five tracks.

Reception

Recorded throughout 1990, Jawbox's first effort was generally brushed off by critics as a sloppy but promising debut. According to Allmusic's reviewer, Andy Kellman, it was "essentially recorded after getting enough songs together to fill out a 12" chunk of vinyl" calling it "an enjoyable, albeit introspectively brutal record." Kellman also described the music in the album as the marriage of the "earlier crunchy side of Joy Division with Throb Throb-era Naked Raygun" while highlighting their cover of the Joy Division track "Something Must Break."  Jim Testa, of Trouser Press, was more positive, writing that the record was "a rich, varied, polyrhythmic tour de force that still bears repeated listening."

Track listing

Personnel
J. Robbins – vocals, guitar
Kim Coletta – bass
Adam Wade – drums

References 

1991 debut albums
Jawbox albums
Dischord Records albums